Shelldon is a computer-animated children's television series directed by Dr. Jirayuth Chusanachoti. The series debuted on Channel 3 in Thailand on October 13, 2008, and on Qubo on October 16, 2009, later being removed from its line-up on September 30, 2012.

Premise
The series tells the adventures of Shelldon and his various friends in the fictional underwater town of Shell Land.

Characters

Main characters
 Shelldon Clam (voiced by Tabitha St. Germain) is a young Yoka star shell who lives in a hotel called the Charming Clam Inn with his family. He likes helping his friends and solving problems.
 Herman (voiced by Richard Ian Cox) is a blue hermit crab with an immense infatuation with "alien" artifacts and "paranormal" events. He has a crush on a classmate Hurly.
 Connie is a money cowry who works at the Charming Clam Inn, so she could do more than rely on her parents' money.

Recurring characters
Dr. Shell (voiced by Lee Tockar) is a  brilliant yet scatter-brained riversnail inventor and a guest in the Charming Clam ever since it was set up and has become something of a permanent resident there. He has traveled widely across the seas in search of inspiration but not interested in making money, only the social benefits his inventions bring to others.
Mama Clam (voiced by Ellen Kenndy) is a magnolia crocus clam who lives and runs the Charming Clam Inn with her husband and three children. She is a cool-headed wife and mother who is not easily daunted by hardship or challenges. Raised in the cut-throat, fast-paced Shell City, Mama Clam is savvy, a careful planner who always seems to know the perfect solution to a problem. 
Papa Clam (voiced by Colin Murdock) is a muddy-brown crocus clam that lives and runs the Charming Clam Inn with his wife and three kids. He is guileless, none too bright, and crass at times. He is easily frazzled by setbacks and his solutions to problems tend to border on the impractical.
Mr. Inkysquid (voiced by Scott McNeil) a small squid who is Shelldon's gang’s school teacher.
Cracken a wealthy sea slug businessman.
Nikki Nautilus a nautilus TV celebrity with a cult following amongst the youngsters in Shell City.
Luther a loggerhead sea turtle who drives a taxi.
Click and Clack two hyperactive Yoka star shells who are Shelldon's cousins.
Hook, Sam and Mack a trio of heavy metal addicted fishes, Hook is a Nkhomo-benga peacock, Sam is a sockeye salmon and Hook is a mackerel.
Stan Starfish a purple starfish who is a bully at Shelldon's school.
Captain 8-Ball a octopus pirate who lives inside of a sunken ship.
Louise a friendly humpback whale that gives Shelldon advices.
Dr. Bao a Chinese Haliotis discus with a herbal knowledge.
Emperor Ehru a fiddler crab who lives in a small island.
Crabby a Christmas Island red crab who is the owner of the neighbourhood bookstore.
Mugsley a sly hermit crab who is Cracken's henchmen.
Napoleon a mantis shrimp that talks in a high-pitched voice.
Wilbur a goofy seagull.
Mayor Yoka a Yoka star shell who is Shell Land's mayor.
Baft and Thwart a duo of greedy human scuba divers that don’t care what damage they do to the ocean or marine life. 
Shello Polo a Mexican Yoka star shell who talks to Shelldon as a ghostly figure.
Mrs. Prim is a prissy crystal red shrimp who obsesses over her nails and hair, which causes her to forget about her peers.
Hurley is a pink sea snail that sometimes appears in the show. She has a crush on a classmate named Herman.

Production
Shelldon is produced by Thai entertainment company Shellhut Entertainment, in co-production with Singaporean studio Tiny Island Productions for the first two seasons, Taiwanese studio AniTime for season 1, American studio Classic Media for season 1, and other Thai studios BeboydCG for season 1, Anya Animation Company and Lunchbox Studio Co., Ltd. for seasons 2 and 3, Animotif for season 2, and Kantana Animation Studios, Teapot Studio and Ad Hoc Animation and Ad for season 3. Voice casting for the series was handled by Giant Wave for the original version and Voice Box Productions in Canada for the English version. Distribution for the series was handled by French company Planet Nemo Animation, Canadian company DHX Media and British company Entertainment Rights (season 1).

Episodes

Season 1

 Crabby's School Daze
 Mascot Mojo
 Alien Encounters
 Baby Shark Blues
 Tide of Doom
 Shell Gone
 Slime, Crime and a Hard Time
 Meet the Cowries
 Locked Out
 Pay Happiness Forward
 The Guru of the Ocean
 I, Shellbot
 Beware the Werefish
 Brand New Day
 One Grain of Sand
 Fast Food Fiasco
 Love at the Opera
 Trapped in the Shallows
 Crabby's Mega Books
 Get a Life
 Doc Rock
 Small Shells, Big City
 Citizen Clam
 You're Not Welcome
 Shelldon Makes Waves
 The Great Treasure

Season 2

 Hello Shello
 Shelldon's Big Reward
 One Small Step For a Friend
 Scout's Honour
 Never Judge a Snail By Its Shell
 Starfish Wars
 Take Me to Your Liter!
 Crouching Bully, Hidden Shellfish
 Big Mollusk on Campus
 Click and Clack's Incredible Christmas
 Battle of the Burgers
 Jumbo Shrimp
 Not So Alien After All
 Battle of the Burgers
 The Great Fish Race
 Cloudy with a Chance of Styrofoam
 A Tattle Tale
 Attack From Otter Space
 Liar, Liar, Shell on Fire
 The Day Mt. Papa Erupted
 Shelldon's Broken Promise
 Saving Stan Starfish
 Lost and Found Out!
 Ghosts in the Shell Land
 An Amusing Adventure
 Herman Finds His Grandpa

Season 3

 The Ends of the Seas
 Fish Can Fly and So Can I
 What's Wrong With Crabby?
 Runaways
 Rastamon, Anemone
 Octo-putz
 Ice Scream
 Mystery Mount
 Shelldon is King
 Winter Games
 Crabby For Mayor
 Tiki Kong
 Whacked to the Future
 Crazy Cash Crash
 Crocodilly
 Connie's Wild Whirl Pool
 Leaning Tower of Pizzas
 Kelp Kookies
 Shelldon and the Giant Sea Stalk
 Read All About It
 Shelldon in the Land of Toys
 Rock Band
 Going For Gold
 Genius of the Seabed
 Dino-Fish!
 Mobile Madness!

Home video
On October 6, 2015, Mill Creek Entertainment released a DVD titled "Shelldon - Under the Sea Adventures!" containing the first two seasons of the show.

References

External links

2009 American television series debuts
2009 Singaporean television series debuts
2009 Thai television series debuts
2012 American television series endings
2012 Singaporean television series endings
2012 Thai television series endings
2000s American animated television series
2010s American animated television series
2000s American children's comedy television series
2010s American children's comedy television series
American children's animated adventure television series
American children's animated comedy television series
American children's animated education television series
American computer-animated television series
Animated television series about children
Fictional undersea characters
English-language television shows
Singaporean animated television series
Thai animated television series